"How Long" is a song by Swedish singer-songwriter Tove Lo, released on 26 January 2022 as the lead single from her fifth studio album Dirt Femme. It also appears on the second season soundtrack of the HBO series Euphoria. The song was produced by A Strut and TimFromTheHouse. The music video was released on 10 February 2022 and directed by Seattle filmmaking duo Kenten.

Charts

Weekly charts

Monthly charts

Year-end charts

Certifications

Release history

References

Tove Lo songs
2022 songs
2022 singles
Songs written by Tove Lo
Songs written by Ludvig Söderberg
Songs written by Sibel Redžep